Wales is a town in Erie County, New York, United States. The town is one of the "Southtowns" of Erie County by virtue of its position in the southeast part of the county, southeast of Buffalo. As of the 2010 census the town had a population of 3,005.

History
The town was formed in 1818 from the town of Willink.

Originally a farming community, the town of Wales is documented through profiles of its churches, civic organizations, businesses, and individual citizens. Established in 1818, the town of 3,000 residents is located in a scenic area of Erie County amid woodlands and streams. Town boards over the years have been respectful of the residents' desire to maintain a small-town atmosphere and quality of life, and the transition to modern life has emphasized small, family-oriented businesses. Personal commitment and a spirit of volunteerism have prevailed in the community, as evidenced by its many interactive organizations.

The town is named because its hills and green fields reminded settlers of the nation of Wales.

Geography

The east town line is the border of Wyoming County.

New York State Route 400 passes through the southwest part of the town.

Climate

According to the Köppen Climate Classification system, Wales has a warm-summer humid continental climate, abbreviated "Dfb" on climate maps.

Demographics

As of the census of 2000, there were 2,960 people, 1,116 households, and 841 families residing in the town. The population density was 83.1 people per square mile (32.1/km2). There were 1,165 housing units at an average density of 32.7/sq mi (12.6/km2). The racial makeup of the town was 98.58% White, 0.10% African American, 0.37% Native American, 0.37% Asian, 0.20% from other races, and 0.37% from two or more races. Hispanic or Latino of any race were 0.74% of the population.

There were 1,116 households, out of which 34.6% had children under the age of 18 living with them, 64.3% were married couples living together, 7.2% had a female householder with no husband present, and 24.6% were non-families. 19.8% of all households were made up of individuals, and 8.2% had someone living alone who was 65 years of age or older. The average household size was 2.65 and the average family size was 3.07.

In the town, the population was spread out, with 24.9% under the age of 18, 6.4% from 18 to 24, 29.3% from 25 to 44, 27.8% from 45 to 64, and 11.6% who were 65 years of age or older. The median age was 39 years. For every 100 females, there were 98.1 males. For every 100 females age 18 and over, there were 97.9 males.

The median income for a household in the town was $51,486, and the median income for a family was $59,350. Males had a median income of $40,125 versus $29,737 for females. The per capita income for the town was $21,616. About 2.1% of families and 3.6% of the population were below the poverty line, including 4.0% of those under age 18 and 3.5% of those age 65 or over.

Notable people
Alice Moore Hubbard, American feminist, writer, and, with her husband, Elbert Hubbard was a leading figure in the Roycroft movement
John James Knowlton, former Wisconsin State Assemblyman
Wally Schang, a catcher in major league baseball from 1913 to 1931. Schang Rd. in Wales named after him
Adoniram J. Warner, former US Congressman, Union Army General in American Civil War

Communities and locations in Wales 
Buffalo Creek – A stream flowing northward through the town. 
Colgrave – A location on Centerline Road in the western part of the town.
Goodleburg Cemetery – An unused cemetery located in the town. 
South Wales – A hamlet on the border of the town of Aurora in the southeast part of Wales. This community lies at the south end of NY-400 on NY-16 and is the home of the Gow School.
Wales Center – A hamlet near the northern town border. 
Wales Hollow (or "Woods Hollow") – A location near the town's western edge.

See also 
 Iroquois Central School District

References

External links
 Town of Wales official website
 "History of Wales, NY" (1898)
 East Aurora Advertiser, local community newspaper

Populated places established in 1818
Buffalo–Niagara Falls metropolitan area
Towns in Erie County, New York